So Far So Good is the first DVD by Atomic Kitten and was released in 2001. It is also available as video. It is also the only DVD which features Kerry Katona before she left the band due to her pregnancy. The video consists of interviews and footage of the promotion tours, the first big concert in Liverpool. The majority of the footage was created using handheld cameras.

It also contains the music videos for "Right Now", "See Ya", "I Want Your Love", "Follow Me", "Whole Again", two versions of "Eternal Flame" and "You Are".

Track listing

Personnel

External links
 Official site
 IMDB entry

Atomic Kitten video albums
2001 video albums
Music video compilation albums
2001 compilation albums